Football Club Kavkazkabel Prokhladny was a Russian football team from Prokhladny. It played professionally from 1990 to 2003. The best result it achieved was 2nd place in the Zone 1 of the Russian Second Division in 2003.

Team name history
 1990–1991 – FC Remontnik Prokhladny
 1992–2006 – FC Kavkazkabel Prokhladny

External links
  Team history at KLISF

Association football clubs established in 1990
Association football clubs disestablished in 2007
Defunct football clubs in Russia
Sport in Kabardino-Balkaria
1990 establishments in Russia
2007 disestablishments in Russia